Visitors to Trinidad and Tobago must obtain a visa unless they come from one of the visa exempt countries.

Trinidad and Tobago signed a mutual visa-waiver agreement with the European Union on 28 May 2015 which was ratified on 15 December 2015. This agreement allows all citizens of states that are contracting parties to the Schengen Agreement to stay without a visa for a maximum period of 90 days in any 180-day period.

Visa policy map

Visa policy 

Holders of passports issued by the following 100 jurisdictions can visit Trinidad and Tobago without a visa:

Citizens of other countries who require a visa may also obtain a "Waiver of the Visa" on arrival if they are holding of a copy of a pre-arranged approval from immigration and if they are not citizens of North Korea, North Macedonia, Venezuela or Vietnam, or holders of normal passports issued by China and Haiti.

Citizens of Argentina, Brazil, Colombia, Costa Rica, Iceland, Israel, Liechtenstein, Mexico, Norway, South Korea, Switzerland, Uruguay and Venezuela may extend their stay.

Holders of diplomatic or service/official passports of China and Haiti do not require a visa.

Tourist arrival statistics

Most visitors arriving to Trinidad and Tobago on short term basis were from the following countries of nationality:

See also

Visa requirements for Trinidad and Tobago citizens

References

Trinidad and Tobago
Foreign relations of Trinidad and Tobago